William Glen Harold Herrington (July 14, 1969 – March 2, 2018), known professionally as Billy Herrington, was an American model and pornographic film actor. In the late 2000s, his appearances in various gay pornography movies led him to become a popular Internet meme on video-sharing websites such as Japan's Nico Nico Douga, where he was referred to by the sobriquet . Since then, at least 15,000 short mash-up parodies of his clips—known as "Gachimuchi Pants Wrestling" (Japanese: ガチムチパンツレスリング, Hepburn: Gachimuchi Pantsu Resuringu)—have been produced by users.

Early life and career 
Herrington was born in North Babylon, New York. Herrington grew up in Long Island learning karate from his father, a sensei. He had interests in boxing, wrestling and martial arts, but did not start bodybuilding until he was 24 years old, after moving to New York City.

Herrington began his erotic career when his then girlfriend surreptitiously submitted his nude pictures to Playgirl magazine. The photographs won him a "Real Men of the Month" contest and a $500 prize. His appearance in the magazine caught the eye of famed photographer Jim French, but it was two years before Herrington posed for his first Colt calendars for French. Soon after, Herrington was filming hardcore gay adult films for All Worlds Video, and appearing on mainstream TV programs such as Love Connection and the Ricki Lake talk show. In 2002, Herrington said the adult film industry helped him to understand his bisexuality.

Among his starring roles is the Roman emperor in the Danish feature film HotMen CoolBoyz (2000). Herrington's scene in Conquered (2001) with Nino Bacci, Colton Ford, Blake Harper, and Jay Ross won the "Best Group Sex Scene" at the 2002 Adult Erotic Gay Video Awards ("Grabbys"). Occasionally, Herrington performed striptease acts at gay clubs in the United States.

Internet meme 

Herrington gained fame in Japan as an Internet meme, after a clip from one of his movies, Workout: Muscle Fantasies 3, was posted on Nico Nico Douga, a Japanese video sharing website, on August 10, 2007. At least 15,000 mash-up parody videos of him have been made, many of which utilize deliberate mishearings (soramimi) of lines from his films. Most notably from Workout: Muscle Fantasies 3 and Lords of the Lockerroom. However, the scenes from the movies were heavily edited with another Japanese meme at the time with censorship, shown in the 4th film of Herrington that was excavated by the Japanese: Buckshot Minute Man Series 18; this would become practice on the videos on Nico Nico Douga. In addition to this, carefully selecting the title of each video to sometimes be based solely on one: the character name, and two: what the person/people in the video does/do (e.g. ).

The three most notable soramimi from Billy Herrington that comes from Workout: Muscle Fantasies 3, that would later make up the  tag, are "Huh? Like embarrassing me, huh?" (あぁん？最近だらしねぇな？, aan? saikin darashi nee na? "What? You are slacking off these days?"); "You got me mad now." (歪みねぇな, yugami nee na, "You are not distorted."); and "That's not right, man." (仕方ないね, shikata nai ne, "It can't be helped.").

In February 2009, Herrington visited Japan to attend a live online event hosted by Nico Nico Douga and garage kit maker Good Smile Company. Herrington said that he was flattered and humbled by his fans' creativity. A limited-edition Herrington figure was announced for a July 2009 release. Two other limited-editions Herrington action figures were announced for the Halloween and Christmas holiday. The Halloween figure was released in October 2009 and the Christmas one was released in December 2009; both are Nico Nico Chyokuhan exclusives. During his time in Japan in 2009, Herrington met Hiroyuki Nishimura, the founder of 2channel.

In April 2013, Herrington went back to Japan for Nico Nico Chokaigi, under his own event: Billy Cruise 2.  He was able to meet Nishimura again, and ZUN of the Touhou Project acclaim.

As of February 2023, over 15,000 Gachimuchi Pants Wrestling videos had been uploaded on Nico Nico Douga alone.

In July 2022, amidst the Russian invasion of Ukraine, a petition to the President of Ukraine regarding the replacement of the Monument to the founders of Odessa (also known as the monument to Empress Catherine the Great) with a monument to Billy Herrington received more than 25,000 votes. President Volodymyr Zelenskyy responded to the petition and asked the Odesa City Council to discuss the demolition of the monument.

Death 
During the evening of March 1, 2018, Herrington was involved in a car accident on California State Route 111 in Rancho Mirage. He was found trapped in the wreckage and was brought to a Palm Springs hospital, where he died the next day. News broke of his death one day later. Fans responded with hundreds of tributes across video sharing sites and message boards. One tribute video uploaded on Nico Nico Douga accumulated over 80,000 views in less than one week. Services for Herrington were held at the Forest Lawn Cemetery in Cathedral City, California.

Legacy 

It is not known how much of Herrington's influence affected Japan, but it led to visual novels, JRPGs, TV shows, manga, and anime to reference Billy Herrington, and his opponent Danny Lee.

Videography 

 Naked Muscle 3 (1998) (ProMuscle Media)
 Naked Outtakes 1 (1998) (ProMuscle Media)
 9½ Inches (1998) (Thor Productions)
 Dark Pursuit (1998) (MuscleGods Productions)
 Worship: Muscle Fantasies 1 (1998) (Can-Am Productions)
 Wrestlers: Muscle Fantasies 2 (1998) (Can-Am Productions)
 Maxon vs. Marcus (1998) (Can-Am Productions)
 Extreme Mat Fights (1998) (Jet Set Productions)
 The Final Link (1999) (All Worlds Video)
 Workout: Muscle Fantasies 3 (1999) (Can-Am Productions)
 Tales from the Foxhole (1999) (All Worlds Video)
 Buckshot Minute Man Series 17 (1999) (Colt Studio Group)
 The Big One in California (1999) (Colt Studio Group)
 Buckshot Minute Man Series 18 (1999) (Colt Studio Group)
 Recharge! (1999) (Colt Studio Group)
 Billy Herrington's Body Shop (1999) (All Worlds Video)
 Lords of the Lockerroom (1999) (Can-Am Productions)
 Summer Trophies (1999) (Pacific Sun Entertainment)
 Playing with Fire 2 (2000) (All Worlds Video)
 HotMen CoolBoyz (2000) (Zentropa)
 Conquered (2001) (All Worlds Video)
 Flesh Trap (2001) (Fox Studios)
 Naked Muscles (2002) (Colt Studio Group)
 Ryker's Web (2003) (Arena Entertainment)
 Minute Man Solo 27: Big Shots (2006) (Colt Studio Group)
 Bodybuilders' Jam #22 (2007) (Jimmy Z Productions)
 Bodybuilders' Jam #23 (2007) (Jimmy Z Productions)
 Billy Herrington: Unseen 1 (2017) (Can-Am Productions)
 Billy Herrington: Unseen 2 (2017) (Can-Am Productions)

Awards and nominations
2000 – Colt Man of the Year
Adult Erotic Gay Video Awards
2002 – Winner – Best Group Sex Scene (for Conquered)
2002 – Nominated – Best Actor (for Conquered)
2002 – Nominated – Best Three-Way Sex Scene (for Conquered)
GayVN Awards
2002 – Nominated – Best Actor (for Conquered)
2002 – Nominated – Best Group Scene (for Conquered)

See also
 List of male performers in gay porn films

References

External links
 
 
 
 Billy Herrington Appearance on Love Connection

1969 births
2018 deaths
20th-century American male actors
21st-century American male actors
American male erotic dancers
American male pornographic film actors
Bisexual male pornographic film actors
Burials at Forest Lawn Cemetery (Cathedral City)
Internet memes
LGBT dancers
American LGBT actors
LGBT people from New York (state)
Pornographic film actors from New York (state)
People from North Babylon, New York
Road incident deaths in California
21st-century LGBT people